The Dallas Texans played in the National Football League (NFL) for one season, 1952, with a record of 1–11.

The Texans are considered one of the worst teams in NFL history, both on and off the field, and while based in Dallas, they were later based in Hershey, Pennsylvania and Akron, Ohio during their only season. After the team folded, the league awarded its assets to the new Baltimore Colts (who moved to Indianapolis in 1984).

Professional football returned to Dallas in 1960, as the American Football League (AFL) commenced operations with one of its eight charter members in Dallas (also called the Texans), while the NFL added the Dallas Cowboys.

While both franchises have proved far more successful both on and off the field, only the Cowboys remained in Dallas: the AFL Texans moved to Kansas City and were re-branded the Chiefs in 1963.

In 1974, the World Football League placed a team in Texas called the Houston Texans. The team transferred to Shreveport, Louisiana before the 1974 season was finished. In 2002, the NFL would revive the Houston Texans nickname when it added a new franchise called the Houston Texans as its 32nd franchise.

Since their demise, the Dallas Texans are regarded as being the last NFL franchise to collapse outright and permanently cease operations: none of the Colts, the AFL/NFL Texans/Chiefs, the Cowboys, or the modern NFL Texans claim any relationship with the earlier 1952 Texans franchise or its predecessors (including NFL charter member the Dayton Triangles), despite the players and assets remaining contiguous.

History
After the 1951 season, the financially troubled New York Yanks franchise, originally founded as the Dayton Triangles, was put on the market by Ted Collins, who had founded the franchise in 1944 as the Boston Yanks before moving it to New York City in 1949, rebranding them as the Bulldogs, and rebranded it again as the Yanks in 1950. After failing to find a buyer, Collins sold the team back to the League.

On January 29, 1952, a Dallas-based group led by a pair of young millionaires, Giles Miller and his brother Connell, completed the purchase of what was ostensibly a new franchise: the first-ever major league sports team based in Texas. However, the Millers also acquired the entire Yanks roster in the sale; thus, for all intents and purposes, the brothers bought the Yanks and relocated them to Dallas.

Home games were set for the 75,000-seat Cotton Bowl, home stadium of the Southern Methodist University Mustangs: the Millers originally wanted to name the team the Rangers, but decided to call them the Texans instead.

1952 season
The Millers believed that the growing state of Texas, with its longstanding support of college and high school football, would be a natural fit for the NFL to move farther south and west, while the team owners approved the move with an 11–1 vote.

While Giles Miller had declared "There is room in Texas for all kinds of football", the opening game against the New York Giants set the tone for the season and the franchise. While the Texans scored the first touchdown, they missed the extra point and did not score again, losing 24–6 in front of only 17,499 fans at the Cotton Bowl.

Fan interest quickly waned as the team collapsed to 0–9 and showed no sign of being competitive: in the four games the Texans played at the Cotton Bowl, they lost all four by an average of eighteen points, and drew a total of only 54,065 fans: this was by far the lowest in the League, and barely half of the 25,000 per game required for the team to break even. The nadir came in a November 9 game against the Los Angeles Rams, a 27–6 blowout loss which attracted only 10,000 fans, and as it turned out, would be the last game the Texans would play in Texas.

By this time, the Millers had sustained losses of $250,000, a staggering sum by 1950s standards, and were unable to meet payroll. The situation was exacerbated by the woeful ticket sales and an inability to get any financial support from local businesses – an important factor even in this decade – to cover these debts, or even operating expenses. Unlike present economic arrangements in which the NFL's multi-billion-dollar television contracts essentially underwrite the league's franchises, teams in this era had no hope of remaining solvent without local support. NFL games weren't carried on national TV at all until 1953, and then only on the now-long-defunct DuMont Television Network, for a pittance compared to the contracts of today. Only two Texans games were televised: October 12 against the Bears in Chicago on ABC, and the Thanksgiving game [see below], also against the Bears, on DuMont. 

The Millers had seen enough, selling the team back to the league on November 14, with five games remaining in the season. Afterwards, the NFL moved the franchise's operations temporarily to Hershey, Pennsylvania (though it kept the Dallas Texans name), and moved the Texans' last two home games out of Dallas, thus making them a traveling team.

The team played one of its remaining two relocated home games at the Rubber Bowl in Akron, Ohio, where the franchise tallied its only win under the Texans moniker, an upset over the Chicago Bears of George Halas, in front of a meager crowd of only 2,208 fans on Thanksgiving Day. This remains the smallest crowd at any NFL game since 1939 (excluding 2020, when the COVID-19 pandemic severely limited attendance).

As a measure of how low the NFL ranked on the sports scene in the early 1950s, the Akron high school Championship Game played at the Rubber Bowl that morning attracted 14,284 fans, far outdrawing the afternoon's professional contest.

Head coach Jim Phelan jokingly suggested because of the small turnout, the Texans players should "go into the stands and shake hands with each fan," while Halas had been so certain that the Bears would overpower the lowly Texans that he started only his second-string players. The Texans jumped out to a 20–2 lead, and after a Bears rally, scored a touchdown with 34 seconds left for an upset 27–23 win.

With the victory, the NFL avoided having a franchise with a winless regular season, something that had not happened since .

The team's final game was a 41–6 blowout loss at the hands of the Detroit Lions: while this game had been scheduled to be played in Dallas, it was moved to Detroit after the league took over the team, thus forcing the Texans (who were the designated home team) to make their second trip of the year to Briggs Stadium – this game drew 12,252 fans, less than one-third of that of the average for the Lions' home games that year. Two weeks later, the Lions won the NFL Championship.

George Taliaferro, the team's leading rusher, was selected to the Pro Bowl at the end of the season.

The end of the Texans
For all intents and purposes, the conclusion of the Texans' brief history was written before they even played their last game. Unable to find a buyer for the team, but not wanting to outright contract the franchise (which would have unbalanced the schedule), the NFL quickly began to solicit bids from other cities. The week after the Texans' Thanksgiving upset, the NFL granted a new franchise to a Baltimore-based ownership group headed by Baltimorean Carroll Rosenbloom, and awarded it the remaining assets (including the players) of the failed Texans. Rosenbloom named his new franchise the Baltimore Colts (after the unrelated previous team from the competing All-America Football Conference, which merged with the NFL in 1950).

The Colts (who relocated to Indianapolis in 1984) do not claim the history of the earlier Triangles/Dodgers/Tigers/Yanks/Bulldogs/Yanks/Texans as their own, despite the Colts' inaugural 1953 roster including many of the players from the previous season's Texans, and a number of players from the 1950-1951 Yanks. Likewise, the NFL considers the new Colts to be a 1953 expansion team and not a continuation of the original Colts, the charter NFL member Triangles or any other franchise.

As a result, the Texans are officially recognized by the NFL as being the League's last team to date to permanently cease operations and not be included in the lineage of any current franchise.

After the Texans
Although the NFL rapidly grew more prosperous during the latter part of the 1950s (especially after the success of "The Greatest Game Ever Played", the 1958 Championship Game at Yankee Stadium between the vaunted New York Giants and the developing Colts, leading to a later profitable nationwide television contract), the 1952 debacle in Dallas left the NFL leery of further expansion.

Unable to persuade other NFL owners to reconsider, Texas oil scion Lamar Hunt, with others, founded the American Football League as a direct competitor to the older NFL.

When Hunt's own Dallas Texans were announced as charter members of the new league, the NFL quickly reconsidered its position on expansion, and made a second venture into Dallas in 1960, establishing what would become a far more successful team, the Dallas Cowboys (briefly known in the beginning as the Dallas Rangers: a minor league baseball team of that same name was expected to disband, but didn't, so the "Cowboys" name was later adopted for the NFL team in mid-March 1960).

Both franchises shared the Cotton Bowl (also the home of Southern Methodist University's (SMU) Mustangs) stadium for their first three seasons. The Cowboys were even more woeful on the field in their inaugural season, enduring a winless season with an 0-11-1 record, and would not post a winning record until 1966, while the AFL Texans, after going .500 over their first two seasons in the new league, would capture the 1962 AFL Championship after defeating the cross-state rival Houston Oilers in double overtime. Both teams also initially struggled to draw enough fans to the Cotton Bowl to turn a profit, but unlike the 1952 Texans they both had owners in Hunt and the Cowboys' Clint Murchison, Jr. with the resources and patience to absorb early losses.

Nevertheless, by the Texans' 1962 championship season they were being consistently outdrawn at the gate by the Cowboys. Hunt, realizing he had no realistic prospect of the Texans competing with the NFL's Cowboys in Dallas, relocated his team to Kansas City and rebranded them as the Chiefs, the second and last of two occasions that a professional American football champion has played the following season in another city.

The Texans nickname was later revived by the NFL for the Houston Texans, an expansion team awarded in 2002 to fill the void left after the Oilers relocated to Nashville, Tennessee in 1997, subsequently being rebranded as the Tennessee Titans.

Notable players

Pro Football Hall of Fame

Others
 Jack Adkisson, more famous as professional wrestler - Fritz Von Erich
Joe Campanella, as Baltimore Colts' general manager in 1967
Brad Ecklund
Weldon Humble
Chuck Ortmann
George Taliaferro
Frank Tripucka 
Buddy Young
George Young, Baltimore high school and NFL coach with the Baltimore Colts, Miami Dolphins and general manager of the New York Giants, then later NFL executive staff.

First round draft selection

After Richter, a star at the University of California, made it clear he did not want to play for Dallas, he was traded to the Los Angeles Rams, sending him closer to home. While the Rams sent a whopping eleven players to Dallas in exchange - still the second-biggest trade involving a single player in NFL history as of 2022 - the deal turned out to be very lopsided in the Rams' favor.

Richter went on to play nine seasons in Los Angeles and be elected to the Pro Football Hall of Fame, while of the eleven players sent to Dallas, defensive back/end Tom Keane was the only one of the eleven who lasted in the League beyond 1952, making All-Pro for the Baltimore Colts in 1953 before he retired in 1955. Of the remaining ten players, four did not last beyond the Texans' only season, and six never played another down of professional football.

Season-by-season

1952 results

^ moved from Dallas

References

External links
The Pro Football Hall of Fame page on the Dallas Texans.
Season stats

 
American football teams established in 1952
American football teams disestablished in 1952
Defunct National Football League teams
Defunct American football teams in Texas
American football teams in the Dallas–Fort Worth metroplex
Dayton Triangles
Boston Yanks
Brooklyn Dodgers (NFL)
1952 establishments in Texas
1952 disestablishments in the United States